Mughr al-Khayt was a Palestinian Arab village in the Safad Subdistrict. It was depopulated during the 1947–1948 Civil War in Mandatory Palestine on May 2, 1948, by the Palmach's First Battalion of Operation Yiftach. It was located 4.5 km northeast of Safad. In  1945 it had a population of 490 Muslims.

References

Bibliography

 (pp. 199, 208,  254)
 (p. 453)

 (p. 178)
 (Karmon, 1960, p. 165)
 
  
 (p.  349)
 (p. 90)
 
  (2nd appendix, p.  136 el-Mughar)
 (p.  189)

External links
Welcome To Mughr al-Khayt
 Mughr al-Khayt, Zochrot
Mughr al-Khayt
Survey of Western Palestine, Map 4: IAA, Wikimedia commons

Arab villages depopulated during the 1948 Arab–Israeli War
District of Safad